2017 Grulla Morioka season.

J3 League

References

External links
 J.League official site

Grulla Morioka
Iwate Grulla Morioka seasons